Catherine Margretta Thomas was a Welsh folk dancer and is known for recording the Welsh dance of the Nantagrw tradition.

Early life 
Catherine Margaretta Thomas was born in 1880 in the village of Nantgarw. Her parents were Daniel and Hannah Davies. As a child she enjoyed watching the local dances as they were performed in an open space below Twyn Chapel in Caerphilly and at Nantgarw and Y Groes Wen. Due to the hostility of the local churches to folk dancing, Catherine Margretta Thomas' own mother was not keen on her daughter going to see these dances, but Catherine was able to convince her father to take her along to witness the displays. The rise of Nonconformism in Wales meant that by the time Catherine Margretta Thomas was in her teens folk dancing had practically been eradicated in Nantgarw.

Welsh National Folk Dance Society 
Dancing had died hard if inconsistently by 1911 when Catherine Margretta Thomas' daughter, Ceinwen Thomas (later Dr. Ceinwen Thomas), was born. But the influence of Nonconformism waned and by the time Ceinwen Thomas was attending school she was discussing the tradition of dancing in Nantgarw with her mother. After Ceinwen Thomas had left college she met Walter Dowding of the Welsh National Folk Dance Society. She told him about her mother's recollections of folk dancing in Nantgarw. He put her in touch with Doris Freeman. Together Catherine Margretta Thomas, Ceinwen Thomas and Doris Freeman worked to notate the dance steps from the traditional dances that Catherine Margretta Thomas could remember. These notes were then passed on to the Welsh National Folk Dance Society by Ceinwen Thomas. A complete set of the dance notation for Y Gaseg Eira was published, alongside the tune Ymdeithgan Gwŷr Penllyn (March of the Men of Penllyn), in the 1959/60 Welsh Folk Dance Magazine.

Criticism 
There has been skepticism expressed over the claims by Dr. Ceinwen Thomas that the dances which her mother recalled were authentic and original Welsh dances reflecting a long and integral Welsh culture of folk dancing. The BBC Welsh Affairs Editor Vaughan Roderick wrote in a blog in 2009 that he doubted the history of these dances. He questioned why only Margretta Thomas had any recollection of these dances being performed. He wrote that his great grandfather had been a minister in Nantgarw in the 1880s but had not seen these dances. He linked it to a romantic nationalist desire to create a longstanding tradition in Wales even if one had not existed in reality.

References 

Welsh traditions
Welsh culture
Welsh people